Kimiko Date was the defending champion but lost in the second round to Naoko Sawamatsu.

Iva Majoli won in the final 6–4, 6–1 against Arantxa Sánchez Vicario.

Seeds
A champion seed is indicated in bold text while text in italics indicates the round in which that seed was eliminated. The top four seeds received a bye to the second round.

  Monica Seles (quarterfinals)
  Conchita Martínez (semifinals)
  Arantxa Sánchez Vicario (final)
  Kimiko Date (second round)
  Magdalena Maleeva (quarterfinals)
  Gabriela Sabatini (first round)
  Iva Majoli (champion)
  Lindsay Davenport (quarterfinals)

Draw

Final

Section 1

Section 2

External links
 ITF tournament edition details
 Tournament draws

Pan Pacific Open
Toray Pan Pacific Open - Singles
1996 Toray Pan Pacific Open